Denis Darbellay (born 5 June 1998) is a Swiss-born in Thai footballer who plays as a defender for Police Tero.

Career

Club career
Darbellay started his career with Swiss fifth tier side Monthey. Before the 2019 season, he signed for Police Tero in the Thai second tier, helping them earn promotion to the Thai top flight.

International career

Darbellay is eligible to represent Thailand internationally through his mother.

References

External links

1998 births
2. Liga Interregional players
Association football defenders
Expatriate footballers in Thailand
FC Monthey players
Living people
Denis Darbellay
Swiss expatriate footballers
Swiss expatriate sportspeople in Thailand
Swiss men's footballers
Swiss people of Thai descent
Denis Darbellay
Denis Darbellay